Drosera dielsiana is a compact rosetted sundew native to South Africa (KwaZulu-Natal, the Free State, the Northern Provinces), Eswatini (Swaziland), Mozambique, Malawi, and Zimbabwe. It was described as a new species by Arthur Wallis Exell and Jack Rodney Laundon in 1956. The diploid chromosome number is 2n=40. It was named in honor of Ludwig Diels, the author of the 1906 monograph on the Droseraceae.

See also
List of Drosera species

References

Carnivorous plants of Africa
dielsiana
Flora of Malawi
Flora of Mozambique
Flora of Zimbabwe
Flora of KwaZulu-Natal
Flora of the Free State
Flora of Swaziland
Flora of the Northern Provinces
Plants described in 1956